Charles F. West (April 24, 1899 – July 14, 1972) was a pioneer aviator and the North Pacific Area Chairman of the Early Birds of Aviation.

Biography
He was born on April 24, 1899. He built a biplane glider and soloed in it in the year 1914.

In 1936 he attempted to rescue Paul Redfern who was lost on an expedition to South America. On one expedition he discovered an Indian tribe that had jerrycans that appeared to be part of Redfern's flight equipment.

He died on July 14, 1972, in Oakland, California.

References 
 
 

1899 births
1972 deaths
Members of the Early Birds of Aviation